The term Creole nationalism or Criollo nationalism refers to the ideology that emerged in independence movements among the  Criollos (descendants of the European colonizers), especially in Latin America in the early 19th century. Creole nationalists wanted an end to control by European powers. That goal was facilitated when the  French Emperor  Napoleon seized control of much of Spain and Portugal (1807-1814), breaking the chain of control from the Spanish and Portuguese kings to the local governors. The colonies rejected allegiance to Napoleonic metropoles, and increasingly the creoles demanded independence.  They sought to overthrow the "peninsulars" - the temporary officials sent from the motherlands to impose control.  They achieved independence in the course of civil wars between 1808 and 1826.  The term "Creole nationalism" is generally applied to other colonies during decolonization.   

Historian Joshua Simon argues: "the Creoles enjoyed many privileges, benefiting in particular from the economic exploitation and political exclusion of the large Indigenous, African, and mixed-race populations... However, as the American subjects of European empires, Creoles were socially marginalized, denied equal representation in metropolitan councils and parliaments, and subjected to commercial policies designed to advance imperial interests at the colonies' expense." Consequently, Creole nationalists sought independent nationhood under Creole control. They typically did not give weight to the native or mixed-race peoples who comprised the great majority of the population in most Latin-American colonies.  In Indonesia, however, the Creole movement was closer to the  indigenous  Indonesian element than it was to the European-born.
 
In Mexico in 1813 at the Congress of Chilpancingo the promulgation of the first Mexican Declaration of Independence expressed the sentiments of Creole nationalism.  According to historian  D. A. Brading, "Creole patriotism, which began as the articulation of the social identity of American Spaniards, was transmuted into the insurgent ideology of Mexican nationalism."  After independence, Creole nationalism deepened thanks to the expansion of the public sphere, the role of elections and political parties, increased availability of newspapers and pamphlets, and the emergence of a nationalistic middle-class which provided a highly supportive audience for imaginative projections of future national achievements.  Utopian fiction became an especially popular tool.

Peruvians in  the 1836–9  Peruvian–Bolivian Confederation expressed demands for Peruvian Creole nationalism. Nationalist sentiments were expressed through the anti-confederationist press, especially in the form  of satiric poetry, short stories and utopian concepts. There was a heavy emphasis upon a glorified version of the Inca past while rejecting the Indian present. The nationalist, even racist  rhetoric pulled together themes that had originated half a century earlier. This emotional rhetoric became the main expression of an ideology that has pervaded Peruvian history ever since. Indeed, the rhetoric climaxed in the 20th century, and it shows signs of crisis in the 21st century.

See also
Criollo people
Creole peoples
Creolisation
Decolonization
Decolonization of the Americas
Latin American wars of independence
Solemn Act of the Declaration of Independence of Northern America
Mexican War of Independence
Constitution of Apatzingán
Sentimientos de la Nación
New Spain

Notes

Further reading
 Bethell, Leslie, ed. The Independence of Latin America (1987)
 Bosma, Ulbe. "Citizens of empire: Some comparative observations on the evolution of creole nationalism in colonial Indonesia." Comparative studies in society and history 46.4 (2004): 656-681.
 Brading, D.A.  The First America: The Spanish Monarchy, Creole Patriots and the Liberal State 1492-1866 (Cambridge University Press, 1993) 
 Brading, David A. "Creole nationalism and Mexican liberalism." Journal of Interamerican Studies and World Affairs 15.2 (1973): 139-190.
 Hintzen, Percy C. "Creoleness and nationalism in Guyanese anticolonialism and postcolonial formation." Small Axe 8.1 (2004): 107-122. online
 Ledgister, F. S. J. Only West Indians: Creole Nationalism in the British West Indies (Africa World Press, 2010).
 Lomnitz, Claudio. Deep Mexico, Silent Mexico: An Anthropology of Nationalism (2001) excerpts
 Lynch, John ed. Latin American Revolutions, 1808-1826: Old and New World Origins (1995)
 McManus, Stuart M. "The Bibliotheca Mexicana Controversy and Creole Patriotism in Early Modern Mexico." The Hispanic American Historical Review 98, no. 1 (2018): 1-41.
 Méndez, Cecilia. "Incas sí, indios no: Notes on Peruvian creole nationalism and its contemporary crisis." Journal of Latin American Studies 28.1 (1996): 197-225.
 Oxaal, Ivar. Black intellectuals come to power; the rise of Creole nationalism in Trinidad & Tobago (1968) online free to borrow
 Poyo, Gerald E. With All, and for the Good of All: The Emergence of Popular Nationalism in the Cuban Communities of the United States, 1848–1898 (Duke UP, 1989).
 Savelle, Max. Empires to Nations: Expansion in America, 1713–1824. (U of Minnesota Press, 1974).
 Simon, Joshua.  The Ideology of Creole Revolution: Imperialism and Independence in American and Latin American Political Thought (2017) excerpt
 Thame, Maziki. "Racial Hierarchy and the Elevation of Brownness in Creole Nationalism." Small Axe: A Caribbean Journal of Criticism 21.3 (54) (2017): 111-123.
 Uribe, Victor M. "The Enigma of Latin American Independence: Analyses of the Last Ten Years," Latin American Research Review (1997) 32#1 pp. 236–255 in JSTOR, historiography

Decolonization
Rebellions against the Spanish Empire
European colonization of the Americas
 
History of South America
Nationalisms
Creole peoples
Creole culture